En komikers uppväxt is a 1992 novel by Swedish writer Jonas Gardell. Loosely based on his own upbringing, the novel portrays a boy, Juha, struggling with acceptance and belonging in suburban Stockholm. Juha is torn between loyalty to his old friends, the outcast kids Jenny and Thomas, and wanting to be one of the cool kids and get the popular girls.

The novel was the basis of a 1992 Swedish TV miniseries in three parts, also called En komikers uppväxt.

On 13 April 2000, the book was given as a gift from the National Agency for Education, Svenska förläggareföreningen and Månpocket to all eighth-grade pupils in Sweden before the World Book Day, which occurred on 23 April, but the giving was done earlier because of Easter.

Recently Gardell adapted his novel into a screenplay for a feature film (English title: My Life as a Comedian), which had its world premiere on 6 September 2019 at the 2019 Toronto International Film Festival. The movie highlights the racism and xenophobia of 1970s suburban Sweden as it emphasizes the foreign background of the three outcast kids: Jenny is played by an Chinese-Swedish girl, Thomas's mother is portrayed as German with a heavy accent and at one point girls are throwing Hitler salutes at her, and Juha's mother is Finnish as in all other versions.

References

1992 Swedish novels
Swedish-language novels
Swedish novels adapted into films